The Lost King is a 2022 British comedy-drama film directed by Stephen Frears and written by Steve Coogan and Jeff Pope, based on the 2013 book The King's Grave: The Search for Richard III by Philippa Langley and Michael Jones. It is a dramatisation of the story of Philippa Langley, the woman who initiated the search to find King Richard III's remains under a car park in Leicester, and her treatment by the University of Leicester in the claiming of credit for the discovery.  

The film stars Sally Hawkins, Coogan, and Harry Lloyd. The film was produced by Pathé, Baby Cow Productions, BBC Film and Ingenious Media, and distributed by Pathé in France and Switzerland as a standalone distributor, and in the UK via Warner Bros. Pictures. The film premiered in Toronto International Film Festival on 10 September 2022, and was released in the United Kingdom on 7 October 2022. The film received generally positive reviews from critics.

Plot 
Living in Edinburgh, Philippa Langley loses a work promotion to a less experienced better-looking woman. She unsuccessfully confronts her male boss that her ME has never affected her work. Distraught, her ex-husband John, who helps with their two teenage boys, tells her to keep her job as they need the money.

Philippa attends the play Richard III, and identifies with Richard whom she feels was unfairly maligned as a hunchback, child killer, and usurper.  She begins to have visions of Richard who appears to her.  She joins the local Richard III Society who believe he was unfairly vilified by Tudor propagandists.

Philippa stops going to work, manages her ME with medication, and begins talking to her Richard III apparition. Her research shows some sources say he was buried in 1485 in the Leicester Greyfriars priory choir area, while others say his body was thrown into the River Soar. After Greyfriars was demolished in the 1530s Reformation, Leicester mayor Robert Herrick around 1600 had a shrine built in his garden saying "Here lies the body of Richard III, sometime king of England."

Philippa attends a lecture in Leicester on Richard, lying to her ex-husband about it being a work trip. She meets Dr Ashdown-Hill, who is publishing a genetic genealogy study on a Canadian direct descendant of Richard III's sister. He tells her to look for Richard in open spaces in Leicester because people for centuries have avoided building over old abbeys.  While walking around Leicester looking for the ancient site of Greyfriars, and seeing apparitions of Richard, she gets a strong feeling that an "R" painted on a car park is the site of Richard's grave.  Returning home, she confesses her activities to John.

Philippa contacts University of Leicester archaeologist Richard Buckley, who dismisses her ideas, but when the university cuts his funding, he gets back to her. Buckley finds an old map of Leicester marking Robert Herrick's property, showing a possible public shrine in his garden. They overlay a modern map of Leicester and find that the shrine may be in the middle of the car park that Philippa had felt strongly about.

Philippa and Buckley team up. She pitches it to Leicester City Council. Richard Taylor of the University of Leicester advises that her amateur "feeling" is too risky. The Council still approves her plan for the publicity, but when ground-radar finds nothing, funding drops out. She turns to the Richard III Society to crowd-fund her "Looking For Richard," and the money comes in from around the world to fund three trenches.  

On day one of the dig, Buckley tells Langley that the dig certificate has been signed, but does not tell her that her name has been omitted. Philippa gets Buckley to start trench one at the painted "R" spot, and they immediately find the legs of a skeleton. Buckley thinks it is an extramural graveyard for monks.  Philippa also confronts Taylor onsite for now falsely claiming credit for leading the project.  She then insists on stopping all work to focus on exposing the complete skeleton in trench one.  Buckley angrily relents and goes home while the crew digs the skeleton. The osteologist soon realises that it is indeed Richard III, with the correct kind of death-blow to the skull, a 30-year-old male, and a badly-curved spine. All found on day one.

University of Leicester leaders rush in to takeover the project. They re-hire Buckley. In February 2013, Taylor announces their findings to the world at a University of Leicester press conference, at which Phillippa is largely sidelined, even by Buckley. Buckley is later given an honorary doctorate by the university.

Richard appears to Philippa a final time at Bosworth Field; he thanks her, and rides off. Richard is shown getting a funeral fit for a king in Leicester Cathedral.  The closing credits say the royal family's website has reinstated Richard as the rightful King of England 1483–1485, so that he is no longer regarded as a usurper. Langley was awarded an MBE for her work.

Cast 

Also appearing are: Jessica Hardwick as The Bookseller, Robert Jack as Alex, John-Paul Hurley as an actor playing Buckingham, Nomaan Khan as Anil, Sinead MacInnes as Hiker, Phoebe Pryce as Jo Appleby, Alasdair Hankinson as Mathew Morris, James Rottger as the actor playing Richmond, Benjamin Scanlan as Raife Langley, Mahesh Patel as Foreign Dignitary, Sharon Osdin as Richard Buckley's PA, Glenna Morrison as Lorna, Adam Robb as Max Langley, Simon Donaldson as Graham, Kern Falconer as Ken, Josie O'Brien as Schoolgirl 2, Robert Maloney as Heckling bar customer, Violet Hughes as Schoolgirl 1, Lukas Svoboda as Car Seller (credit only), Iman Akhtar as Receptionist, Kim Carlton as Funeral Guest, Lati Gbaja as Shopper (uncredited).

Philippa Langley makes a cameo appearance at the end of the film as a seated Guest in the final re-burial scene of Richard III (uncredited)

Production 
In November 2020, it was announced that Stephen Frears was set to direct the film, based on a screenplay written by Steve Coogan and Jeff Pope, and co-starring Coogan. In March 2021, it was announced that Sally Hawkins had joined the cast as Philippa Langley. Principal photography began in April of that year, and took place across a variety of locations in the Edinburgh area, including Morningside and Newtongrange.

Release 
The film premiered at the 47th Toronto International Film Festival, and was released in UK cinemas on 7 October 2022. IFC Films has acquired U.S. distribution rights to the film.

Reception

Critical response
 Metacritic, which uses a weighted average, assigned a score of 58 out of 100 based on 15 critics, indicating "mixed or average reviews". Hawkins' performance has been met with critical acclaim. The Evening Standards four-star review stated "Sally Hawkins is Oscar-worthy". Likewise, Heat and iNews gave the film four out of five stars, with the latter stating "Coogan is marvellous". Peter Bradshaw of The Guardian gave the film two stars out of five, commenting on the "uneven" nature of the script and that scenes with Richard III "make the film odd and unrelaxed", while these scenes were praised in Matthew McMillan's four-star review for The Upcoming, for imbuing the film "with an offbeat allure", describing the film as "a treat […] spearheaded by Hawkins's performance, and guided by the dexterity of Frears's craft". The film made The Guardian readers' "best films of 2022 list" with the reviewer stating "As a lecturer myself, I particularly enjoyed the way the film pricked the bubble of academic arrogance".  Kevin Maher of The Times also gave the film two stars, remarking, "The Lost King is oddly petty, with a cast of characters essentially shouting, like the seagulls in Finding Nemo: 'Mine! Mine! Mine!'"

Reception by the University of Leicester
Based on the trailer, some of the lead University of Leicester archaeologists involved in the story did not feel that the film's presentation as "the true story" was correct, and that it had under-represented their involvement, and over-represented Langley's financial input to the project. Langley contends that the archaeologists took undue credit for finding the remains of Richard III given that she had led the search, raised the funding for the dig and commissioned the archaeologists. Following the UK première of the film the University of Leicester issued a press release, including the following abstract:
<blockquote>We worked closely with Philippa Langley throughout the project, and she was not sidelined by the University. Indeed, she formed part of the team interview panel for every single press conference connected to the King.</p>The suggested whereabouts of the King's remains was public knowledge prior to Philippa's intervention, however [sic], we recognise she was the positive driving force behind the decision to dig for Richard III.</blockquote>

Langley issued a rebuttal, calling the University's statement "misleading":
<blockquote>Contrary to the misleading media statement issued by the University, I did feel side-lined (and continue to feel side-lined) by the University wrongly taking my credit for leading the search for the King's remains. The only press conference that mattered was the one on 4 February 2013 to confirm that the remains were those of Richard III. That conference was the one attended by the world's media. I was not invited by the University to sit on the panel that faced the journalists and the University wrongly presented themselves as leading the search that I had commissioned and paid for. It is true the University invited me to address the conference but as the 13th of 13 speakers, long after the live TV news feed had ended.
</p>As for the general whereabouts of the extensive Greyfriars precinct – where some (not all) believed Richard III might be buried – yes this was known, but no one knew the layout of the buildings and therefore where the Greyfriars Church itself (and therefore the body of the King) might be (if he wasn't in the River Soar as most leading historians then believed). Only through my intuition and research was the precise area identified where the dig should take place. In a matter of hours of starting to dig, the King's remains were revealed. If the University (and everyone else) knew exactly where to dig, why hadn't they done so before?</blockquote>

Richard Taylor said to the BBC:
I'm portrayed as kind of a bullying, cynical, double-crossing, devious manipulator which is bad, but then when you add to that I behave in a sexist way and a way that seems to mock Richard III's disabilities, you start to get into the realm of defamation.

The filmmakers responded to Taylor by saying:
The university's version of events has been extensively documented over the past 10 years. Philippa's recollection of events, as corroborated by the filmmakers' research, is very different.

Taylor stated in October 2022 that he is "likely" to take legal action against the filmmakers over its inaccuracies.

Reception by other archaeologists
British archaeologist and academic Mike Pitts, writing on History Extra (website of BBC History magazine), describes the film as "a misleading saga based on a farrago of untruths and omissions". He says that by showing a "phalanx of male archaeologists and administrators, interested only in furthering their own careers at Langley's expense", the film portrays science unfairly, and in a manner that is closed to outsiders.  Pitts later responded angrily to the film's review in The Guardian readers' "best films of 2022 list" where it was praised for having "pricked the bubble of academic arrogance", responding to the newspaper that: "Contrary to movie PR and most media coverage, however, its key thread is fiction: the “bubble of academic arrogance” is a fantasy of the film's anti-intellectual agenda".

See also
The Dig, a 2021 drama film based on the 1939 excavation of Sutton Hoo in Suffolk, England.

References

External links 
 
 
 
 The Lost King, Statement on the film by the Richard III Society (9 September 2022)
 VIDEO: The University's Search for Richard III, international press conference by Richard Taylor and Richard Buckley (4th February 2013)

2020s British films
2020s English-language films
2022 biographical drama films
British biographical drama films
Films based on non-fiction books
Comedy-drama films based on actual events
British docudrama films
Films scored by Alexandre Desplat
Films directed by Stephen Frears
Films set in London
Films set in Scotland
Films about archaeology